Cold War Night Life is the 1982 debut album by Rational Youth, containing their greatest hit "Saturdays in Silesia". Long out of print, it was re-released by EMI on CD in 1997 after an e-mail campaign by fans. It was subsequently re-released by Universal Music in 2019.

The online magazine and record label, Cold War Night Life, was named after the album. In 2017, it released a tribute album, Heresy, that featured a number of tracks from Cold War Night Life performed by electronic artists from Canada, Germany, Australia, Sweden, Norway and Britain.

In 2019, Cold War Night Life was re-released in deluxe 2-LP and CD formats by Universal Music Canada.

Track listing

Additional tracks

Personnel
 Tracy Howe - vocals, synthesizers
 Bill Vorn - synthesizers, vocoder, programming
 Kevin Komoda - synthesizers
 Mario Spezza - synthesizers on "I Want to See the Light" and "Coboloid Race"

References 

Rational Youth albums
1982 debut albums